This toponymical list of counties of the United Kingdom is a list of the origins of the names of counties of the United Kingdom. For England and Wales it includes ancient and contemporary counties.

Background

Throughout the histories of the four countries of the United Kingdom, a variety of languages have been used to name places. These languages were often used in parallel with each other.  As a result, it is often difficult to assess the genuine etymology of a placename, hence some of the entries below are assigned more than one meaning, depending on which language was used to originally give the place its name. One of the most common words used in county names in the United Kingdom is the suffix shire. This is a West Saxon word meaning share/division.

England

{|  class="wikitable sortable"  align="left"
!  bgcolor="#EEEEEE" | County name
!  bgcolor="#EEEEEE" | Abbreviation
!  bgcolor="#EEEEEE" | Established
!  bgcolor="#EEEEEE" | Language of origin
!  class="unsortable" bgcolor="#EEEEEE" | Earliest form 
!  class="unsortable" bgcolor="#EEEEEE" | Derivation
|-  align="left"
| Avon
| AV
| 1974
| Brythonic
| n/a
| Named after the River Avon. Avon is an Anglicized version of a Brythonic word meaning river. County abolished in 1996.
|-  align="left"
| Bedfordshire
| BE
| Ancient
| Old English
| Beadafordscīr
| Shire of Bedford. Bedford itself derives from Bieda's ford
|-  align="left"
| Berkshire
| BK
| Ancient
| Brythonic + Old English
| Bearrucscīr
| Shire of Berrock Wood. Berrock possibly from Brythonic "Hilly place".
|-  align="left"
| Buckinghamshire
| BU
| Ancient
| Old English
| Buccingahāmscīr
| Shire of Buckingham. Buckingham itself means Home of Bucca's people.
|-  align="left"
| Cambridgeshire
| CA
| Ancient
| Old English
| Grantabrycgscīr
| Shire of Cambridge. Cambridge was previously known as Grantbridge (OE Grantanbrycg), meaning Bridge on the River Granta. There is a reference in Gildas to Caer Grawnt indicating an earlier Brythonic origin. The name of the city became Cambridge due to the Norman influence within the city in the 12th century.  The name of the river Cam within Cambridge is a backwards derivation.
|-  align="left"
| Cheshire
| CH
| Ancient
| Old English
| Legeceasterscīr, later Ceasterscīr
| Shire of Chester. Chester derives from the OE ceaster meaning an old Roman town or city.  This itself stems from the Latin word castra, meaning 'camp' (or 'fort').  The city's former name was Legacæstir (circa 8th century) meaning  'City of the legions'.
|-  align="left"
| Cleveland
| CV
| 1974
| English
| n/a
| Named after the Cleveland area of North Yorkshire, which encompasses the hills and coast of the Whitby area. This historic area was partially included in the new county created in 1974, which also included the urban areas of Teesside. Cleveland is derived from Old English and literally means 'Cliff land'. County abolished 1996.
|-  align="left"
| Cornwall
| CO
| Ancient
| Brythonic + Old English
| Westwealas
| The late Roman name for Cornwall was Cornubia, from the name of the tribe which lived there, the Cornovii, meaning 'people of the peninsula', either from Latin cornu or from Brythonic cern, both meaning 'horn'. The suffix wall is derived from OE wealas meaning 'foreigners', as was also applied to the Celtic people of Wales. In the 6th/7th century AD, the Anglo-Saxons referred to Cornwall as 'Westwealas' to differentiate it from the more northerly land that eventually became Wales. Cornwall is thus a blend of Cornubia + Wealas. 
|-  align="left"
| Cumberland
| CD
| Ancient
| Brythonic + Old English
| Cumbraland
| 'Cumber' is derived from Cymry, the word that the Brythonic inhabitants of the region used to identify themselves (similar to the Welsh name for Wales, Cymru). Thus Cumberland means 'Land of the Cumbrians'. 
|-  align="left"
| Cumbria
| CU
| 1974
| Latin
| n/a
| 'Cumbria' is derived from Cymry, the word that the Brythonic inhabitants of the region used to identify themselves (similar to the Welsh name for Wales, Cymru). Cumbria is a Latinised version of this word, which was chosen in 1974 for the name of the new county.
|-  align="left"
| Derbyshire
| DE
| Ancient
| Old Norse + Old English
| Dēorbȳscīr
| Shire of Derby. Derby itself derives from the ON meaning 'Animal settlement'.
|-  align="left"
| Devon
| DV
| Ancient
| Brythonic
| Defnascīr
| Originally 'Defnas'. The word shire was added and has subsequently been lost. Defnas is derived from the Celtic tribal name Dumnonii, which is of unknown origin. The Welsh name for Devon is Dyfnaint and the Cornish name is Dewnans.
|-  align="left"
| Dorset
| DO
| Ancient
| Old English
| Dorsǣt
| Literally 'People of Dorchester' (cf. Somerset). Dorchester (originally Dornwaraceaster) is an Old English name probably derived from the Roman name Durnovaria, with the addition of the suffix 'ceaster' (denoting an old Roman town). Durnovaria is in turn derived from a lost Brythonic name meaning fist (possibly place with fist-sized pebbles).
|-  align="left"
| County Durham
| DU
| Ancient
| Old English
|
| Named after Durham. Durham is derived from the OE Dūnholm meaning 'Hill island'.
|-  align="left"
| Essex
| EX
| Ancient
| Old English
| Ēast Seaxe
| Literally 'East Saxons'. The county was the former petty Kingdom of the East Saxons.
|-  align="left"
| Gloucestershire
| GE
| Ancient
| Old English
| Gleawcesterscīr
| Shire of Gloucester. Gloucester is derived from the Old English name Gleawcester''', meaning approximately 'Roman town called Glevum'. Glevum is in turn derived from a Brythonic name meaning bright place.
|-  align="left"
| Greater London
| GL
| 1965
| English
| n/a
|County formed from its predecessor, the County of London with the addition of the immediately surrounding boroughs and districts of the greater metropolitan area of London. Whilst the county dates from 1965 (Local Government Act 1963), the term Greater London had already been in common usage since, at least, the post-war planning schemes dating from about 1944.
|-  align="left"
| Greater Manchester
| GM
| 1974
| English
| n/a
| Greater metropolitan area of Manchester. Manchester itself is OE version of the Roman name Mancunium. The first part of the name in turn derives from Mamm, a Brythonic word meaning 'breast-like hill'.
|-  align="left"
| Hampshire
| HA
| Ancient
| Old English
| Hāmtūnscīr| Shire of Southampton; the county has occasionally been called the 'County of Southampton'. Southampton was known in Old English as Hāmwic or Hāmtūn 'home farm', being the place claimed in the Anglo-Saxon Chronicle as being near to the original landing place of the family who became the Royal house of Wessex. Some have claimed that 'South' was added later to distinguish Southampton from Northampton, but there has never been any authoritative source providing the evidence.
|-  align="left"
| Herefordshire
| HE
| Ancient
| Old English
| Herefordscīr| Shire of Hereford. Hereford is OE meaning 'ford suitable for the passage of an army'. Originally known as Magonsæte (Magonset) meaning "people of Magnis", a former Roman town near the modern Kentchester. 
|-  align="left"
| Hertfordshire
| HT
| Ancient
| Old English
| Heortfordscīr| Shire of Hertford. Hertford is OE meaning 'ford frequented by deer'.
|- align="left"
| Humberside
| HB
| 1974
| English
| n/a
| Area around the River Humber. Humber is a pre-Celtic word of unknown origin. County abolished in 1996.
|-  align="left"
| Huntingdonshire
| HU
| Ancient
| Old English
| Huntadūnscīr| Shire of Huntingdon. Huntingdon is OE meaning 'Hunters' hill'.
|-  align="left"
| Isle of Wight
| IW
| 1974
| English + Brythonic
| Wiht| Ancient OE Wiht may mean 'place of division'. Alternatively, it may be derived from the Brythonic "eight-sided"; cf. Welsh wyth ('eight').  The Roman name was Vectis. 
|-  align="left"
| Kent
| KE
| Ancient
| Brythonicor earlier
| Cent or Centlond| (Land of the) Cantii or Cantiaci, a Celtic tribal name possibly meaning white, bright.
|-  align="left"
| Lancashire
| LA
| Ancient
| Old English
| 
| Shire of Lancaster. Lancaster itself derived from the name of the River Lune (Lune is a Brythonic word meaning 'pure'), and the OE suffix 'ceaster', denoting a Roman town.
|-  align="left"
| Leicestershire
| LE
| Ancient
| Old English
| Lægreceastrescīr| Shire of Leicester. Leicester itself derives from Ligore, a Celtic tribal name of unknown origin, with the OE suffix 'ceaster', denoting a Roman town.
|-  align="left"
| Lincolnshire
| LN
| Ancient
| Old English
| Lincolnescīr| Shire of Lincoln. Lincoln is derived from the Roman name Lindum, which in turn derives from the Brythonic Lindon ('The pool'). The county was administered through divisions known as Parts. The Parts of Lindsey, Parts of Kesteven and the Parts of Holland. These were each formed as county councils in 1889 and continued until 1974.
|-  align="left"
| London
| LO
| 1889
| English 
| London| County of London. Formed to cover all the parishes across the area of the Metropolitan Board of Works under the Local Government Act 1888. The Metropolitan Boroughs within the county were formed over the next few years. The name London is derived from the Roman name of the City of London Londínĭum, which in Old English became Lundenwic. Perhaps 'place at the navigable or unfordable river' from two pre-Celtic (pre-Indo-European) roots with added Celtic suffixes. The county was absorbed into Greater London in 1965
|-  align="left"
| Merseyside
| ME
| 1974
| English
| n/a
| Area around the River Mersey. Mersey is an Old English word meaning 'boundary river'.
|-  align="left"
| Middlesex
| MX
| Ancient
| Old English
| Middelseaxe| Literally 'Middle Saxons'.
|-  align="left"
| Norfolk
| NO
| Ancient
| Old English
| Norþfolc| 'Northern people'
|-  align="left"
| Northamptonshire
| NH
| Ancient
| Old English
| Norðhāmtūnescīr| Shire of Northampton. Northampton was originally 'Hāmtūn', and the county Hāmtūnescīr; the North was added later to distinguish them from Hampshire and Southampton. Hāmtūn means 'home farm' in OE.
|-  align="left"
| Northumberland
| ND
| Ancient
| Old English
| Norðhymbraland.  Older Norþanhymbrarīce for the Kingdom of Northumbria.
| Ancient territory of those living north of the River Humber. Humber is a pre-Celtic word of unknown origin.
|-  align="left"
| Nottinghamshire
| NT
| Ancient
| Old English
| Snotingahāmscīr| Shire of Nottingham. Nottingham itself derived from OE name meaning 'home of Snot's people'.
|-  align="left"
| Oxfordshire
| OX
| Ancient
| Old English
| Oxnafordscīr| Shire of Oxford. Oxford means derives from the OE name 'ford used by Oxen'.
|-  align="left"
| Rutland
| RU
| Ancient
| Old English
| Roteland| 'Rota's territory'.
|-  align="left"
| Shropshire
| SH
| Ancient
| Old English
| Scrobbesbyriġscīr| Shire of Shrewsbury. Shrewsbury is derived from the OE name 'Scrobbesbyriġ' meaning 'scrubland fort'
|-  align="left"
| Somerset
| SO
| Ancient
| Old English
| Sumorsǣt| 'People of Somerton'. Somerton is OE for 'farm used in the summer'. Alternatively, Somerset may be derived from 'people of the summer land', with Somerton derived from thereafter.
|-  align="left"
| Staffordshire
| ST
| Ancient
| Old English
| Stæffordscīr| Shire of Stafford. Stafford is OE meaning 'ford by a landing place'.
|-  align="left"
| Suffolk
| SK
| Ancient
| Old English
| Sūþfolc| 'Southern people'
|-  align="left"
| Surrey
| SU
| Ancient
| Old English
| Sūþrīge| 'Southern district', referring to its position south of the River Thames
|-  align="left"
| Sussex
| SX
| Ancient
| Old English
| Sūþ Seaxe| Literally 'South Saxons'. The county was the former petty Kingdom of the South Saxons.
|-  align="left"
| Tyne and Wear
| TW
| 1974
| English
| n/a
| Area between the River Tyne and River Wear. Tyne is an alternative Brythonic word for 'river' and Wear is a Brythonic word meaning 'water'.
|-  align="left"
| Warwickshire
| WA
| Ancient
| Old English
| Wæringscīr| Shire of Warwick. Warwick is OE for 'Dwellings by the weir'
|-  align="left"
| West Midlands
| WM
| 1974
| English
| n/a
| Area in the west of the English Midlands, centred on Birmingham.
|-  align="left"
| Westmorland
| WE
| Ancient
| Old English
| Westmōringaland| Literally 'land west of the moors'.
|-  align="left"
| Wiltshire
| WI
| Ancient
| Old English
| Wiltūnscīr| Shire of Wilton. Wilton is OE for 'willow farm' An older OE name for the people of Wiltshire was Wilsæt (cf. Dorset, Somerset).
|-  align="left"
| Worcestershire
| WO
| Ancient
| Old English
| Wigreceastrescīr and variants
| Shire of Worcester. Worcester itself is derived from an OE name meaning 'Roman town of the Weogora'. Weogora is a Brythonic name meaning 'from the winding river'.
|-  align="left"
| Yorkshire
| YO
| Ancient
| Middle English
| Eoferwīcscīr| Shire of York. York is directly derived from the ON Jórvík ('horse bay'). However, Jorvik was the Norse interpretation of the OE Eoforwīc ('boar town'), which itself was an interpretation of the Roman name for York, Eboracum. This is in turn derived from a Brythonic name, Eboracon probably meaning place of yew trees. The County of York, being the largest county in England, was divided for administrative purposes into three parts called Ridings. The name Ridings derives from the Old Norse þriðjungur, meaning 'thirds'. 
|}

Northern Ireland

Scotland

Wales

ReferencesThe Oxford Dictionary of Placenames by A.D. Mills and Adrian Room (1991) Oxford University PressPàrlamaid na h-Alba: Ainmean-àite le buidheachas do dh' Iain Mac an TailleirThe Celtic Place-names of Scotland'' by W.J. Watson (Birlin 2004)

See also
List of counties of the United Kingdom
British toponymy
List of generic forms in British place names
Welsh placenames
United Nations Group of Experts on Geographical Names

British toponymy
United Kingdom
Lists of counties of the United Kingdom